Steve Long is a retired American soccer player who played in the American Soccer League, North American Soccer League and Major Indoor Soccer League.

Although born in the Belgian Congo, he was raised in Brazil. He attended Wheaton College where he played on the men's soccer team from 1975 to 1978.  He scored 59 goals and added 21 assists for 139 points.  This puts him in fourth place on the team's all-time career points list.  He was inducted into the school's Athletic Hall of Fame in 1993. In 1979, he played for the Pennsylvania Stoners of the American Soccer League. He then moved to the Chicago Sting of the North American Soccer League. In 1981, he moved, this time to the Memphis Americans of the Major Indoor Soccer League. When the team moved west to Las Vegas in 1984, Long went with it.  However, he retired at the end of the 1984–1985 season.

References

External links
NASL/MISL stats

1957 births
American soccer players
American Soccer League (1933–1983) players
Chicago Sting (NASL) players
Las Vegas Americans players
Living people
Major Indoor Soccer League (1978–1992) players
Memphis Americans players
North American Soccer League (1968–1984) indoor players
North American Soccer League (1968–1984) players
Pennsylvania Stoners players
Association football midfielders
Association football forwards